Hickory Corners is an unincorporated community in Mahoning County, in the U.S. state of Ohio.

History
Variant names were Hickory and Hickoryville. A school was in operation at Hickory as early as 1825. A post office called Hickory was established in 1891, and remained in operation until 1901.

References

Unincorporated communities in Mahoning County, Ohio
1825 establishments in Ohio
Populated places established in 1825
Unincorporated communities in Ohio